West Ham's greatest triumph as they beat TSV Munich 1860 in the Cup Winners Cup Final at Wembley Stadium.  Both goals in the 2-0 win were scored by outside right Alan Sealey.

1964-65
English football clubs 1964–65 season
1964 sports events in London
1965 sports events in London
1964-65